The 2022 Music City Bowl was a college football bowl game that was played on December 31, 2022, at Nissan Stadium in Nashville, Tennessee. The 24th annual Music City Bowl, the featured Iowa from the 
Big Ten Conference and Kentucky from the Southeastern Conference (SEC). The game began at 11:10 a.m. CST and aired on ABC. It was one of the 2022–23 bowl games concluding the 2022 FBS football season. Sponsored by translation and language services company TransPerfect, the game was officially known as the TransPerfect Music City Bowl.

Teams
The game features Iowa of the Big Ten and Kentucky of the Southeastern Conference (SEC). Both teams received and accepted invitations on December 4, 2022. This is their second-ever meeting—they previously met in a bowl game following the 2021 season, the 2022 Citrus Bowl, won by Kentucky.

Iowa Hawkeyes

The Hawkeyes will be playing in the Music City Bowl for the first time, and enter the game with a 7–5 record, 5–4 in conference play. They faced two ranked FBS opponents (at the time of the matchup) during the season, losing to No. 4 Michigan and No. 2 Ohio State.

Kentucky Wildcats

The Wildcats enter the Music City Bowl with a 7–5 record, 3–5 in conference play. Kentucky will be making its sixth appearance in the Music City Bowl. The Wildcats opened their season with four consecutive wins and were ranked as high as No. 7 before losing three of their next four games. They faced six ranked opponents (at the time of the matchup), defeating No. 12 Florida, No. 16 Mississippi State, and No. 25 Louisville while losing to No. 14 Ole Miss, No. 3 Tennessee, and No. 1  Georgia.

Game summary

Statistics

References

Music City Bowl
Music City Bowl
Music City Bowl
Music City Bowl
Iowa Hawkeyes football bowl games
Kentucky Wildcats football bowl games